This is a list of artists who record, or who have recorded, for Atlantic Records. Listed in parentheses are names of affiliated labels for which the artist recorded for Atlantic in conjunction with.

0-9
2 Live Crew (Luke/Atlantic) 
22Gz (Sniper Gang/Atlantic)
4 Non Blondes (Interscope/Atlantic)

A
A Boogie wit da Hoodie (Highbridge/Atlantic)
Aaliyah (Blackground/Atlantic) 
Aaron Barker (Atlantic Nashville) 
ABBA (US/Canada) 
AC/DC (outside Australia/New Zealand) 
Ace Frehley (Megaforce/Atlantic) 
Adia Victoria
Adrian Belew 
Against The Current
Agnetha Fältskog (US) 
Akagündüz Kutbay 
Akinyele (Interscope/Atlantic) 
Al Hibbler
Alan White
Alannah Myles
Albert King 
Alec Benjamin
Alex Metric
Alex Newell
Alexis Korner (Atlantic/Metronome)
Alice Cohen
Alice Cooper
All-4-One (Blitzz/Atlantic)
Alley Boy (Duct Tape Ent.) 
Ally Brooke
Alphabeat (Neon Gold/Atlantic)
Alphaville (US) 
alt-J
Anderson East
Angela Via 
Anita Baker 
Poe (Modern/Atlantic)
Anna Clendening
Anne-Marie
Frida 
A.D.O.R. 
Apartment 26
Apathy 
April Lawlor
Archer/Park (Atlantic Nashville) 
Archie Bell & The Drells 
Aretha Franklin 
Arizona
Art Blakey
Arthur Brown
Artifacts (Big Beat/Atlantic) 
Audio Two (First Priority Music/Atlantic) 
Audiovent 
Ava Max
Average White Band

B
B.o.B (Grand Hustle/Rebel Rock/Atlantic) 
Bad Company (Swan Song/Atco/Atlantic)
Bad Religion 
Badfinger (Radio/Atlantic)
Badlands 
Balu Brigada (Warner Music Australasia/Atlantic)
Banda Black Rio (Warner/Elektra/Atlantic) 
Bas Noir 
Bazzi
Bel Canto (Lava/Atlantic) 
Ben E. King 
Ben Platt
Bent Fabric (Atco/Atlantic) 
Bette Midler
Betty Wright (Alston/Atlantic) 
Bhad Bhabie (Atlantic/B.H.A.D. Music)
Big Joe Turner 
Big Kuntry King (Grand Hustle/Atlantic) 
Bill Chinnock
Bill Haley and the Saddlemen
Billy "Crash" Craddock (Atlantic Nashville)
Billy Cobham
Billy Taylor 
Birdy
Black Heat 
Blaenavon
Bloc Party (Vice/Atlantic)
Blue Magic (Atco/Atlantic) 
Blue Man Group (Lava/Atlantic) 
Blues Brothers 
Bob Geldof (US/Canada)
Bobby Darin (Atco/Atlantic) 
Bobby Short 
Boney M. (Atco/Atlantic) 
Bonnie Tyler (East West America/Atlantic)
Boosie Badazz (Trill Entertainment/Atlantic)
Boz Scaggs
Brandy 
Breland (Bad Realm/Atlantic)
Brent Cobb
Brett Eldredge (Atlantic Nashville)
Brian Auger (Atco/Atlantic)
Brian Culbertson
Briston Maroney
Broken Hands
Brook Benton (Cotillion/Atlantic) 
Bruno Mars (Atlantic/Elektra)
Brynn Cartelli 
Buckcherry (Eleven Seven/Atlantic) 
Burna Boy (Atlantic Records)
Bush (Trauma/Interscope/Atlantic; later just Atlantic)

C
Camera Can't Lie
Camouflage
Canned Heat
Cardi B
Carl Craig
Cash Cash (Big Beat/Atlantic Records)
Ce Ce Rogers
Cece Winans 
CeeLo Green
Cerrone
Champion Jack Dupree
Change
Changing Faces (Big Beat/Atlantic)
Charles Mingus
Charli XCX (Asylum/Atlantic)
Charlie Puth
Chef'Special (Fueled by Ramen/Atlantic)
Chic
Chris Braide
Chris Connor
Chris Rock
Chris Rush
Chris Squire
Christina Perri
Christine and the Queens
Chromeo
Chuck Willis 
Chuckie
Chuckii Booker
CKay (Atlantic/Warner Music Africa)
Clannad
Clarence Carter
Classified
Clean Bandit
Clutch
Cody Simpson
Cold
Coldplay (UK)
Collective Soul
Company B
Confederate Railroad (Atlantic Nashville)
Cool C
Cordae
Craig David (US)
Craig G
Craig Morgan (Atlantic Nashville)
Cream (US/Canada)
Crosby, Stills, Nash & Young
Cuban Link (Terror Squad/Big Beat/Atlantic)
Curren$y (Jet Life/Atlantic)
Curtis Fuller

D
Da Lench Mob (Street Knowledge/East West America/Atlantic) 
Da Youngstas (East West America/Atlantic) 
Dan Hartman
Daniel Johnston 
Danity Kane (Bad Boy/Atlantic) 
Das EFX (EastWest America/Atlantic) 
David Crosby
David Gray (iht/Atlantic - outside US/Canada)
David Rogers
Dawn Robinson (Q/Atlantic)
Death Cab for Cutie
Debbie Gibson
Debelah Morgan
Del Water Gap (Canvasback/Atlantic)
Deniece Williams 
Devonsquare
DJ Drama (Grand Hustle/Atlantic) 
DLOW
D'Molls
Dog Blood
Dog is Dead
Don Q (Highbridge/Atlantic)
Don Toliver (Cactus Jack/We Run It/Atlantic/APG)
Donna Lewis
Donna Summer (US/Canada)
Donna Ulisse (Atlantic Nashville)
Double X Posse (Big Beat/Atlantic)
Doug Lazy 
Doug Stone (Atlantic Nashville)
Dr. Dre (Death Row/Interscope/Atlantic)
DRAM (Empire/Atlantic)
Dream Theater (Atco/EastWest/Atlantic)
Duke Ellington
Duncan Sheik 
Dusty Springfield (US and Canada)

E
Ed Sheeran (Asylum/Atlantic/Elektra)
Eddie Floyd (Stax/Atlantic) 
Eddie Harris
Elastica
Elektric Music 
ELHAE
Ellie Lawson
Emerson, Lake & Palmer (Cotillion/Atlantic)
En Vogue 
ENISA (Highbridge/Atlantic)
Enya (US/Canada) 
Eric Burdon
Erroll Garner
Everything but the Girl (North America)

F
Fabolous (Desert Storm/Atlantic) 
Fat Joe (Atlantic/Big Beat/Mystic/Terror Squad) 
Fire Town 
Flo Rida (Poe Boy/Atlantic)
Foreigner 
Francis Lai (Finnadar/Atlantic) 
Freddie Hubbard
Frehley's Comet (Megaforce/Atlantic) 
Frightened Rabbit
Funeral for a Friend

G
Galantis
Gary Barlow
Gary Moore (Mirage/Atlantic) (US)
Gayle (singer) (Arthouse/Atlantic)
Geddy Lee (Anthem/Atlantic) (outside Canada) 
Gene McDaniels
Genesis (US/Canada)
George Carlin
George Flynn (Finnadar/Atlantic) 
George Lewis
Gerald Albright 
Gerardo (Interscope/Atlantic)
Gia Farrell  
Governor (Grand Hustle/Atlantic) 
Girls Next Door (Atlantic Nashville)
Glen Campbell (Atlantic Nashville)
Gnarls Barkley (Downtown/Atlantic)
Goldie Lookin Chain (Eastwest/Atlantic)
GOT7
Graham Nash
Gregory Gray (Atco)
Grouplove (Canvasback/Atlantic)
Gucci Mane (1017/GUWOP/Atlantic)

H
Halestorm
Hall & Oates
Harold Budd 
Hayley Kiyoko
Hayley Williams (Paramore)
Honne
Hootie and the Blowfish
Horslips 
Hostyle
Hunter Hayes (Atlantic Nashville)

I
I Fight Dragons 
Icona Pop (TEN/Big Beat/Atlantic)
İlhan Mimaroğlu (Finnadar/Atlantic)
Immortal Technique (Viper/Atlantic)
In This Moment
Inch
INXS (Atco/Atlantic) (US/Canada) 
Iron Butterfly (Atco/Atlantic) 
IU (EDAM (Kakao)/Atlantic)
Ivory Joe Hunter

J
J. Geils Band 
Jack Harlow (Generation Now/Atlantic)
Jack Ü  
Jacquie Lee 
James Blunt (Custard/Atlantic)
Jamie Lawson
Jamie Miller
Jamie Walters 
Janelle Monáe
Jasmine Thompson
Jason Derulo
Jason Mraz
Jax
Jay Park (Atlantic Records UK)
Jay Williams (Big Beat/Atlantic)
JayDaYoungan (Ruffwayy/Atlantic)
Jaymes Young 
Jay-Z (Roc Nation/Atlantic) 
Jean Carne (Omni/Atlantic)
Jean-Luc Ponty (Atlantic Jazz) 
Jeff Greene (Aurora Atlantic NYC)
Jeff Stevens and the Bullets (Atlantic America, later rebranded as Atlantic Nashville)
Jennifer Love Hewitt
Jeremy Spencer
Jess Glynne (Black Butter/Atlantic)
Jessie James Decker 
Jet (outside Australasia) 
Jewel 
Jill Scott
Jim Capaldi
Jim Carrol Band
Jim Croce (Saja/Atlantic)
Jimmy Castor Bunch
Jimmy Giuffre
Jimmy Page 
Jimmy Yancey 
Jimmy Yeary (Atlantic Nashville) 
Jive Bunny and the Mastermixers (Atco/Atlantic)
JJ Fad (Ruthless/Atco/Atlantic) 
João Gilberto (US/Canada)
Jody Watley 
Joe Firstman 
Joe Morris
Joe Tex (Dial/Atlantic) 
Joe McIntyre (Q/Atlantic)
John Coltrane
John Mellencamp 
John Michael Montgomery (Atlantic Nashville) (concurrently on Warner Records)
John Parr (US/Canada)
John Prine
Johnny Rivers
JoJo 
Jomanda (Big Beat/Atlantic) 
Jon Anderson
Jon Astley
Joyner Lucas 
Judas Priest (outside Europe and Asia)
Julian Lennon (US/Canada)
Juliana Hatfield (Atlantic/Mammoth)
Junior M.A.F.I.A. (Undeas/Big Beat/Atlantic) 
Junior Senior (US)
Justice
Juvenile (UTP/Atlantic)

K
K. Michelle 
Kam (Street Knowledge/East West America/Atlantic) 
Kâni Karaca 
Kap G
Karen Tobin 
Katy Tiz
Kehlani
Keith Jarrett 
Keke Palmer 
Kelly Clarkson
The Bucketheads (Henry Street Music/Big Beat/Atlantic) 
Kenny Rogers  (143/Atlantic)
Kep1er
Kevin Gates (Bread Winners’ Association/APG/Atlantic)
Kevin Lyttle (VP/Atlantic)
Kid Loco 
Kid Rock  (Top Dog/Lava/Atlantic)
Kieran Kane (Atlantic Nashville) 
Kiiara
Kill Hannah 
Kim Mitchell  (US)
King Crimson (outside Europe)
King Curtis
King Missile 
King's X 
Kix 
Knife Party (Big Beat/Atlantic)
Kodak Black (Dollaz N Dealz/Sniper Gang/Atlantic)
Kristin Garner (Atlantic Nashville)
KSI
K-Solo 
Kwabs
Kwamé
Kyle (Indie-Pop/Atlantic)
Kym Sims (Atco/Atlantic)

L
Breeze 
Larry Willoughby (Atlantic America) 
Laura Branigan 
Laura Pausini
Lauren Daigle
Lauriana Mae
LaVern Baker 
Gowan (Anthem/Atlantic - outside Canada)
Lea Salonga 
Led Zeppelin (Swan Song/Atlantic)
Lee Konitz 
Leif Garrett (Scotti Bros./Atlantic)
Lennie Tristano 
LeVert
Lieutenant Stitchie
Lil Baby
Lil James (Generation Now/Atlantic)
Lil' Kim (Undeas/Big Beat/Atlantic)
Lil' O
Lil Skies
Lil Uzi Vert (Generation Now/Atlantic)
Lime (Critique/Atco/Atlantic)
Lina
Linda Eder 
Linear
Lisa Hartman
Little Boots (679/Atlantic)
Little Brother (Hall of Justus Music/ABB/Atlantic)
Little-T and One-Track Mike (Lava/Atlantic)
Liz Larin 
Lizzo
LMNT (Atlantic/Walt Disney)
LOLO
London Boys
Loona (Blockberry Creative/Atlantic/Warner Music Korea)
Lou Gramm
Loudness (Atco/Atlantic)
L'Trimm (Hot Productions/Atlantic)
Lucy Brown
Lucy Woodward 
Lulu (Atco/Atlantic)
Lupe Fiasco
Luke (Luke/Atlantic)
Lykke Li (Atlantic/LL Recordings)
Lynyrd Skynyrd

M
M2M (US)
Machel Montano
Madame X
Maggie Bell
Major Harris
Manowar
Marc Anthony
Marc Cohn
MARINA
Marion Raven
Mark Morrison
Marky Mark And The Funky Bunch (Interscope/Atlantic)
Martin Delray (Atlantic Nashville)
Martin Lawrence (East West America/Atlantic)  
Martin Solveig
Mary Wells (Atco/Atlantic) 
Mason Ramsey
Matchbox Twenty
Matoma
Matt Bianco (US)
Matt Corby
Matt King (Atlantic Nashville) 
Max Frost
Max Q (US/Canada)
Mayday Parade
MC Lyte (First Priority Music/Atlantic)
MC Skat Kat
MC5
Meat Loaf (US/Canada)
Meco (US)
Meek Mill (MMG/Dream Chasers/Atlantic)
Meg Myers
Mel and Kim
Mel Tormé 
Melanie Martinez
Melvins
Michael Watford (East West America/Atlantic) 
Michel'le (Ruthless/Atco/Atlantic)
Michie Mee & LA Luv (First Priority Music/Atlantic)
Mick Jackson 
Mick Jagger
Mick Jones
Mighty Joe Plum
Miike Snow (Downtown/Atlantic)
Mike & the Mechanics (US/Canada)
Mike Rutherford (US/Canada)
Mila Mason (Atlantic Nashville)
Miroslav Vitous 
Modern Jazz Quartet
Molly Kate Kestner
Mose Allison 
Mott The Hoople (US)
Moya Brennan 
Mr. Big
Megan thee Stallion (1501 Certified/300 Entertainment/)

N
Nappy Roots
Narada Michael Walden 
Nathan Dawe
Neal McCoy (Atlantic Nashville)
NEEDTOBREATHE
Nice & Wild
Kamen Nick
No Address
Noa Kirel
NoCap
Noel Haggard (Atlantic Nashville)
Noga Erez
Nolan Thomas (Mirage/Atco/Atlantic) 
Nona Gaye (Third Stone/Atlantic)
Nu Shooz

O
O.T. Genasis (Conglomerate/Atlantic)
O'Bryan (Third Stone/Atlantic Records)
Off Broadway
Old Dogs (Atlantic Nashville)
Oliver Tree
Omarion (MMG/Atlantic)
OMB Peezy
ONE OK ROCK (A-Sketch/Fueled By Ramen/Atlantic)
OPM
Original Flavor
Ornette Coleman
Oscar Brown Jr.
Otis Redding (Atco/Atlantic)
Otto Knows
Overkill

P
P1Harmony (FNC Entertainment/Atlantic) (US/Canada then Worldwide)
P$C (Grand Hustle/Atlantic) 
P.O.D.
Pajama Party
Pantera (Atco/Atlantic)
Paolo Nutini
Paramore (Fueled By Ramen/Atlantic)
Passport
Patrick Moraz (US/Canada)
St. Paul
Paul Rodgers
Percy Humphrey
Percy Sledge 
Peter Frampton
Peter Gabriel (Atco/Atlantic - US/Canada)
Ph.D. (US)
Phil Collins (Face Value/Atlantic) (US/Canada then worldwide)
Philly's Most Wanted
Pink Sweats
Pino Presti 
PJ
Plan B
Player 
Plies (Big Gates/Slip-N-Slide/Atlantic)
Plus One
PnB Rock
Poison the Well
Polydor
Portugal. The Man
Primus (Interscope/Atlantic)
Professor Griff (Luke/Atlantic)
Professor Longhair
Project 86
Pulse Ultra
Punch Miller

Q
Quad City DJs (Big Beat/Atlantic)
Quando Rondo (Never Broke Again, LLC/Atlantic)
Queensrÿche

R
Ratt
Ravyn Lenae
Ray Charles
Ray J
Ray Kennedy (Atlantic Nashville) 
RBL Posse (Big Beat/Atlantic)
Redd Kross
Regina
Richard Barone (MESA/Bluemoon/Atlantic) 
Richard Wagner 
Rico Nasty
Ringo Starr (US/Canada)
Rita Ora
Rival Sons
Rob Thomas
Robbie Patton 
Robert James Waller 
Robert Plant (Es Paranza/Atlantic) 
Roberta Flack 
Robin Lee (Atlantic Nashville) 
Robin S. (Big Beat/Atlantic)
Robin Schulz
Rockie Fresh (MMG/Atlantic)
Roddy Ricch
Rodney O & Joe Cooley
Roger Ballard (Atlantic Nashville) 
Roger Daltrey (US/Canada)
Roland Kirk 
Roxy Music (Atco/Atlantic)
Roy Buchanan 
Jagwar Twin
Ruarri Joseph
Rudimental (Black Butter/Asylum/Atlantic)
Rumer (East West/Atlantic)
RuPaul (Rhino/Atlantic)
Rush (Anthem/Atlantic) (outside Canada)
Ruth Brown
Ryan Cabrera

S
Sabrina Claudio (SC Entertainment/Atlantic)
Sad Café (Swan Song/Atlantic then just Atlantic) (US/Canada)
Sage the Gemini (Global Gemini/Atlantic)
Saigon (Fort Knocks/Atlantic) 
Saint Phnx
Sam and Dave 
Sam Martin
Savatage 
Sean Paul (VP/Atlantic) (outside Canada)
Serena Ryder
Sérgio Mendes
Seven Mary Three (Mammoth/Atlantic) 
SF9 (band) (FNC Entertainment/Atlantic)
Shadows Fall 
Shannon (Mirage/Atco/Atlantic) 
Sharon Tandy 
Shawty Lo (D4L/Dee Money/Poe Boy/Asylum/Atlantic)
Shinedown
Shoreline Mafia
Shorty Rogers
Sia
Silverchair (Eleven/Atlantic) 
Simple Plan (Lava/Atlantic)
Sinead O'Connor
Sissy Spacek
Sister Sledge (Cotillion/Atlantic)
Skid Row
Skillet (Lava/Atlantic)
Skrillex (Big Beat/Atlantic)
Skyy
Slave (Cotillion/Atlantic)
Sleeze Beez
Small Faces (US)
Snoop Doggy Dogg (Death Row/Interscope/Atlantic)
Snow Tha Product (Product Ent./Atlantic)
Solomon Burke 
Sophia Fresh (Nappy Boy Entertainment/Atlantic)
Sorana
Soul Brothers Six
South 65 (Atlantic Nashville)
Southside Johhny & the Jukes (Mirage/Atco/Atlantic)
Sparks
Stacey Q (Atlantic)
Stacy Lattisaw (Cotillion/Atlantic) 
Stars on 45 (Radio/Atlantic)
Stephen Stills
Steve "Silk" Hurley
Steve Arrington 
Steve Howe
Stevie B (Saja/Atlantic)
Stevie Nicks (Modern/Atlantic) (US/Canada)
Stick McGhee
Straight No Chaser
Sugar Ray (Lava/Atlantic)
Suzanne Ciani (Finnadar/Atlantic)
Suzy Q
Sweet Inspirations
Sweet Sensation (Atco/Atlantic)
Switchfoot (Lowercase People/Atlantic)

T
T.I. (Grand Hustle/Atlantic) 
Take That (Atlantic) 
Tally Hall (Quack! Media/Atlantic) 
Tamia 
Tank (R&B Money/Atlantic)
Taproot 
Tarkan 
Tayla Parx
Teddybears STHLM 
Telex 
Ten City 
Terror Fabulous (East West America/Atlantic) 
Testament 
Tha Dogg Pound (Death Row/Interscope/Atlantic) 
The Academy Is... (Fueled By Ramen/Decaydance/Atlantic) 
The Bellamy Brothers (Atlantic Nashville) 
The Beloved (US)
The Braxtons 
The Brides of Funkenstein 
The Cardinals
The Clovers
The Coasters
The Corrs (143/Atlantic)
The Cult (Lava/Atlantic)
The D.O.C. (Ruthless/Atco/Atlantic)
The Darkness
The Delta Rhythm Boys
The Donnas
The Drifters
The Family Stand 
The Firm
The Fixx
The Format 
The Funky Worm
The Honeydrippers (Es Paranza/Atlantic)
The Hutchens (Atlantic Nashville)
The Kinison 
The Knocks (Big Beat/Atlantic)
The Lemonheads
The Manhattan Transfer
The Marcy Brothers (Atlantic Nashville)
The Orwells (Canvasback Music/Atlantic)
The Pointer Sisters (Planet/Atlantic) 
The Rascals
The Rolling Stones (Rolling Stones/Atlantic)
The Spinners
The Streets (Vice/Atlantic)
The System
The Temptations 
The Trammps 
The Velvet Underground 
The War on Drugs
Theory of a Deadman
Tim Maia (Warner/Elektra/Atlantic)
Tim Rushlow (Atlantic/Warner Music Nashville)
Timbaland & Magoo (Blackground/Atlantic) 
Tiny Grimes
TNT 
Tommy Shaw 
Tony Banks (US/Canada)
Tori Amos 
Tracy Lawrence (Atlantic Nashville) 
Trevor Jackson
Trey Songz (Songbook/Atlantic)
Trick Daddy (Slip-N-Slide/Atlantic) 
Trina (Slip-N-Slide/Atlantic) 
Troop 
Tuff
Twenty One Pilots (Fueled by Ramen/Atlantic/Elektra)
Twista (Big Beat/Atlantic)
Twisted Sister 
Ty Dolla $ign (Taylor Gang/Pu$haz Ink/Atlantic)
Ty Stone (Top Dog/Atlantic)

U
Uncle Kracker (Top Dog/Lava/Atlantic)

V
Vance Joy (Outside Australia and New Zealand)
Vandenberg (Atco) 
Vangelis 
Vicious Rumors 
Virgos Merlot 
Voggue

W
Waka Flocka Flame (Brick Squad Monopoly/1017/Atlantic)    
Wallows
Wayne Wonder (VP/Atlantic) 
Weezer (Crush Music/Atlantic)
Whethan
Whigfield (Curb/Atlantic) 
White Lion (except Japan) 
Why Don't We
Wilder Woods
Willa Ford (Lava/Atlantic) 
Wilson Pickett 
Winger 
Wishbone Ash (US/Canada)
Wiz Khalifa (Taylor Gang/Atlantic)
Woody Lee (Atlantic Nashville) 
Wrathchild America

X
X Japan (East West America/Atlantic)
Xavier Dunn (1825/Atlantic)

Y
Y Kant Tori Read 
Yanni 
YBN Almighty Jay
YBN Nahmir 
Yes (Atco/Atlantic)
YNW Melly (300/Atlantic)
Yomo & Maulkie (Ruthless/Atco/Atlantic) 
Young Dro (Grand Hustle/Atlantic)
Young Thug (YSL/300/Atlantic)
YoungBoy Never Broke Again (Never Broke Again/Atlantic)
Yo-Yo (Street Knowledge/East West America/Atlantic) 
Yusef Lateef 
Yusuf Islam (US/Canada/Mexico)

Z
Zac Brown Band (Southern Ground/Atlantic) 
Zak Abel
Zebra 
Zero 7

References